Catonephele acontius, the Acontius firewing, is a nymphalid butterfly species found in South America. It was first described by Carl Linnaeus in 1771 (who gave the type location as "China", a designation followed by some later authors).

Description
(Male, described by Dru Drury): Upperside. Antennae, head, thorax, and abdomen black. Wings fine velvety black. An orange-coloured bar, about  inch (6 mm) broad, rises in the middle of the superior wings, running circularly and crossing the inferior ones, meeting about the middle of the abdominal edges.

Underside. Palpi white. Tongue brown. Breast and legs white. Abdomen yellow brown. Wings shining brown, exhibiting various shades of changeable colours; the tips terminating in an ash colour. Wings scarcely dentated. Wingspan  inches (70 mm).

Subspecies
Catonephele acontius acontius (Guianas, Surinam, Brazil: Amazonas)
Catonephele acontius caeruleus Jenkins, 1985 (Bolivia)

References

Biblidinae
Nymphalidae of South America
Butterflies described in 1771
Descriptions from Illustrations of Exotic Entomology
Taxa named by Carl Linnaeus